Kinyongia uthmoelleri, known commonly as the Hanang hornless chameleon, Müller's leaf chameleon, and Uthmöller's chameleon, is species of lizard in the family Chamaeleonidae. The species is endemic to Tanzania.

Etymology
The specific name, uthmoelleri, is in honor of German herpetologist Wolfgang Uthmöller.

Habitat

Description

Reproduction
K. uthmoelleri is oviparous.

Subspecies
Two subspecies are recognized as being valid, including the nominotypical subspecies.
Kinyongia uthmoelleri artytor 
Kinyongia uthmoelleri uthmoelleri

References

Further reading
Lutzmann, Nicolá; Stipala, Jan; Lademann, Ralph; Krause, Patrick; Wilms, Thomas; Schmitz, Andreas (2010). "Description of a new subspecies of Kinyongia uthmoelleri (Müller, 1938) (Squamata: Chamaeleonidae) with notes on its captive propagation". Bonn zoological Bulletin 57 (2): 281–288. (Kinyongia uthmoelleri artytor, new subspecies).
Müller L (1938). "Über die von den Herren W. Uthmöller und L. Bohmann im britischen Mandatsgebiet "Tanganyika Territory" gesammelten Chamäleons ". Zoologischer Anzeiger 122: 20-23. (Chamaeleo uthmoelleri, new species). (in German).
Nečas P, Nagy P (2009). "A Contribution to the Knowledge of the Biology of Uthmöller's Chameleon, Kinyongia uthmoelleri ". Sauria 31 (1): 15–21.
Spawls, Stephen; Howell, Kim; Hinkel, Harald; Menegon, Michele (2018). Field Guide to East African Reptiles, Second Edition. London: Bloomsbury Natural History. 624 pp. . (Kinyongia uthmoelleri, p. 276).

Kinyongia
Reptiles of Tanzania
Endemic fauna of Tanzania
Reptiles described in 1938
Taxa named by Lorenz Müller